Regulations for the Order and Discipline of the Troops of the United States was a drill manual written by Inspector General Friedrich Wilhelm von Steuben during the American Revolutionary War. Commissioned to train troops at Valley Forge, Steuben first formed a model drill company of 100 men who were in turn to train further companies until the entire army was trained under the same procedures as the first company of troops. Following this exercise, Steuben published his drill instructions in a manual that was published in 1779 and widely distributed throughout the Continental Army. This manual became commonly known as the army's "Blue Book". It remained the official U.S. military guide until 1812.

References

External links

Full text at Archive.org
 

Documents of the American Revolution
Military training books
Military education and training in the United States
1779 non-fiction books
Valley Forge
Continental Army